Mormons have both used and been subjected to significant violence throughout much of the religion's history. In the early history of the United States, violence was used as a form of control. Mormons were violently persecuted and pushed from Ohio to Missouri, from Missouri to Illinois and from Illinois, they were pushed west to the Utah Territory. There were incidents of massacre, home burning and pillaging, followed by the death of their prophet, Joseph Smith. Smith died from multiple gunshot wounds from a lynch mob at a jail in Carthage, Illinois; Smith had defended himself with a small pistol smuggled to him by church leader Cyrus Wheelock and he was then shot while trying to flee from a window. There were also notable incidents in which Mormons perpetrated violence. Under the direction of Mormon prophets and apostles, the Mormon burned and looted Davies County, attacked and killed a member of the Missouri state militia, and carried out an extermination order on the Timpanogos.  Other Mormon leaders led the Mountain Meadows Massacre, Battle Creek massacre, and Circleville Massacre.  Mormons have also been a major part in several wars, including the 1838 Mormon War, Walker War and Black Hawk War.

The memory of this violence has affected both the history and the doctrines of the Latter Day Saint movement.

History of religious violence against Mormons

Early Mormon history is marked by many instances of violence, which have helped to shape the church's views on violence. The first significant instance occurred in Missouri. Mormons who lived there tended to vote as a bloc, which often lead to the unseating of the local political leadership. Differences culminated in hostilities and the eventual issuing of an executive order (often called the Extermination Order) by Missouri governor Lilburn Boggs declaring, "the Mormons must be treated as enemies, and must be exterminated or driven from the State." Three days later, a militia unit attacked a Mormon settlement at Haun's Mill, resulting in the death of 18 Mormons and no militiamen. The Extermination Order was not formally rescinded until 1976.

In Nauvoo, Illinois, conflict was often based on the tendency of Mormons to "dominate community, economic, and political life wherever they landed." The city of Nauvoo had become the largest in Illinois, the city council was predominantly Mormon, and the Nauvoo Legion (the Mormon militia) continued to grow. Other issues of contention included polygamy, freedom of speech, anti-slavery views during Smith's presidential campaign, and the deification of man. After the destruction of the press of the Nauvoo Expositor, Smith was arrested and incarcerated in Carthage Jail, where he was killed by a mob on June 27, 1844. The conflict in Illinois became so severe that most of the residents of Nauvoo fled across the Mississippi River in February 1846.

After Mormons established a community hundreds of miles away in the Salt Lake Valley in 1847, anti-Mormon activists in the Utah Territory persuaded President Buchanan that the Mormons in the territory were rebelling against the United States under the direction of Brigham Young. In response, in 1857 Buchanan sent one-third of United States's standing army to Utah in what is known as the Utah War. During the Utah War, the Mountain Meadows massacre occurred.

Instances of theological violence

Mountain Meadows massacre

The widely publicized Mountain Meadows massacre occurred on September 11, 1857, during a period of escalating tensions between Mormons and the United States which Mormons viewed from an apocalyptic lens. It was a mass killing of about 130 emigrants, mostly from Arkansas, who were passing through the Utah territory on their way to California. The massacre was influenced, in part, by unfounded rumors that some of the emigrants had previously persecuted Mormons. Leading the massacre were William H. Dame, regional church president and colonel of the Mormon militia, and his battalion leaders Isaac C. Haight (also a regional church president), John D. Lee, and John H. Higbee. The militia surrounded the emigrants and laid siege, and after forcing them to surrender, the militia systematically executed all of them except the youngest children, who were taken and adopted by nearby residents. The militia covered up the massacre by blaming it on largely uninvolved Native American tribes. Though Dame, Haight, and other leaders were indicted in the 1870s for their roles in the massacre, John D. Lee was the only participant who stood trial, where he was ultimately convicted and executed. 

Though widely connected with the blood atonement doctrine by the United States press and general public, there is no direct evidence that the massacre was related to "saving" the emigrants by the shedding of their blood (as they had not entered into Mormon covenants); rather, most commentators view it as an act of intended retribution. Brigham Young was accused of either directing the massacre or with complicity after the fact. When Young was interviewed on the matter and asked if he believed in blood atonement, he replied, "I do, and I believe that Lee has not half atoned for his great crime." He said "we believe that execution should be done by the shedding of blood instead of by hanging," but only "according to the laws of the land" .

American troops who visited the site later constructed a cairn at the site, topped with a sign saying "Vengeance is mine; I will repay, saith the Lord." According to a Mormon present at the event, when Young visited the site sometime afterward, he remarked "Vengeance is mine, and I have taken a little"; his party proceeded to destroy the cairn and memorial.

List of Mormon wars and massacres
This list includes all wars and massacres in which Mormons have played a significant role on either side of the conflict.

Mormon views on capital punishment

Capital punishment in Mormon scripture

Religious justification for capital punishment is not unique to Mormons.

Retribution

Joseph Smith, the founder of the Latter Day Saint movement, was a strong proponent of capital punishment, and he favored execution methods that involved the shedding of blood as retribution for crimes of bloodshed. In 1843, he or his scribe commented that the common execution method in Christian nations was hanging, "instead of blood for blood according to the law of heaven." In a March 4, 1843, debate with church leader George A. Smith, who argued against capital punishment, Smith said that if he ever had the opportunity to enact a death penalty law, he "was opposed to hanging" the convict; rather, he would "shoot him, or cut off his head, spill his blood on the ground, and let the smoke thereof ascend up to God" . In the church's April 6, 1843, general conference, Smith said he would "wring a thief's neck off if I can find him. if I cannot bring him to justice any other way." Sidney Rigdon, Smith's counselor in the First Presidency, also supported capital punishment involving the spilling of blood, stating, "There are men standing in your midst that you can't do anything with them but cut their throat & bury them." On the other hand, Smith was willing to tolerate the presence of men "as corrupt as the devil himself" in Nauvoo, Illinois, who "had been guilty of murder and robbery," in the chance that they might "come to the waters of baptism through repentance, and redeem a part of their allotted time" .

Brigham Young, Smith's successor in the LDS Church, initially held views on capital punishment that were similar to those of Smith. On January 27, 1845, he spoke approvingly of Smith's toleration of "corrupt men" in Nauvoo who were guilty of murder and robbery on the chance that they might repent and be baptized . On the other hand, on February 25, 1846, after the Saints had left Nauvoo, Young threatened adherents who had stolen wagon cover strings and rail timber with having their throats cut "when they get out of the settlements where his orders could be executed". Later that year, Young gave orders that "when a man is found to be a thief, ... cut his throat & throw him in the River." Young also stated that the decapitation of repeated sinners "is the law of God & it shall be executed." There are no documented instances of such a sentence being carried out on the Mormon Trail.

In the Salt Lake Valley, Young acted as the executive authority while the Council of Fifty acted as a legislature. One of his main concerns in the early Mormon settlement was theft, and he swore that "a thief should not live in the Valley, for he would cut off their heads or be the means of haveing it done as the Lord lived." A Mormon listening to one of Young's sermons in 1849 recorded that he said that "if any one was catched stealing to shoot them dead on the spot and they should not be hurt for it."

In the Utah Territory, there was a law from 1851 to 1888 that allowed persons who were convicted of murder to be executed by decapitation; during that time, no person was executed by that method .

Blood atonement

"Blood atonement" is the controversial concept that there are certain sins to which the atonement of Jesus does not apply, and before a Mormon who has committed such sins can achieve the highest degree of salvation, he or she must personally atone for the sin by "hav[ing] their blood spilt upon the ground, that the smoke thereof might ascend to heaven as an offering for their sins" . Blood atonement was supposed to be voluntarily practiced by the sinner, or it was contemplated as being mandatory in a theoretical theocracy which was planned for the Utah Territory, but it was supposed to be carried out with love and compassion for the sinner, not out of a desire for vengeance . The concept was first taught in the mid-1850s by the First Presidency of the Church of Jesus Christ of Latter-day Saints (LDS Church) during the Mormon Reformation, when Brigham Young governed the Utah Territory as a near-theocracy. Even though there was discussion about implementing the doctrine, there is no direct evidence that it was ever practiced by the Mormon leadership in their capacity as the leaders of both church and state . There is inconclusive evidence, however, to suggest that the doctrine was independently enforced a few times by Mormon individuals . Scholars have also argued that the doctrine contributed to a culture of violence, which, combined with paranoia that resulted from the church's long history of being persecuted, incited over a hundred extrajudicial killings by Mormons, including the Mountain Meadows Massacre .

LDS Church leaders taught the concept of blood atonement well into the 20th century within the context of government-sanctioned capital punishment, and it was responsible for laws in the state of Utah that allowed prisoners on death row to be executed by firing squad (Salt Lake Tribune, 11 May 1994, p. D1). Although the LDS Church repudiated the teaching in 1978, it still has adherents within the LDS Church as well as adherents within Mormon fundamentalism, a schismatic branch of the Latter Day Saint movement whose adherents seek to follow early Mormon teachings to the letter. Despite its repudiation by the LDS Church, the concept also survives in Mormon culture, particularly with regard to capital crimes. In 1994, when the defense in the trial of James Edward Wood alleged that a local church leader had "talked to [Wood] about shedding his own blood," the LDS Church's First Presidency submitted a document to the court that denied the church's acceptance and practice of such a doctrine, and included the 1978 repudiation.

Penalties

Blood oaths
Historically, Mormon ritual provided an example in which capital punishment is contemplated, though not necessarily required, for violations of historical blood oaths in the endowment ritual. The blood oaths in the ceremony were related to protecting the ritual's secrecy. Participants made an oath that rather than ever revealing the secret gestures of the ceremony, they would rather have: "my throat ... be cut from ear to ear, and my tongue torn out by its roots," "our breasts ... be torn open, our hearts and vitals torn out and given to the birds of the air and the beasts of the field," "your body ... be cut asunder and all your bowels gush out," showing an entire refusal to accept the promises made in the washing and anointing ordinances . They were changed to a reference to "different ways in which life may be taken" . The entire "penalty" portion of the ceremony was removed by the LDS Church in 1990, and during its lifetime, there is no documented instance in which a person has been killed for violating the oaths of secrecy.

Law of vengeance
After the death of Joseph Smith, Brigham Young added an oath of vengeance to the Nauvoo endowment ritual. Participants in the ritual made an oath to pray that God would "avenge the blood of the prophets on this nation". "The prophets" were Joseph and Hyrum Smith, and "this nation" was the United States. The oath was removed from the ceremony during the 1920s.

In 1877, Young noted what he viewed as a similarity between Smith's death and the blood atonement doctrine in that "whether we believe in blood atonement or not," Smith and other prophets "sealed their testimony with their blood."

Violence related to LGBT people 

In October 1976, LDS Church apostle Boyd K. Packer gave a sermon, "To Young Men Only," in which he encouraged young male Latter-day Saints to defend themselves, physically if necessary, against sexual assaults by other men. The sermon was later published as a pamphlet and was widely circulated to LDS young men. Historian D. Michael Quinn, who is gay, criticized Packer's comments, saying they constituted an endorsement of gay bashing; he also argued that the church endorses such behavior by continuing to publish Packer's speech.

On July 5, 2015, the LDS Church issued an official statement in response to the Supreme Court ruling on gay marriage and to clarify its official position of nonviolence to the LGBT community:

The gospel of Jesus Christ teaches us to love and treat all people with kindness and civility—even when we disagree. We affirm that those who avail themselves of laws or court rulings authorizing same-sex marriage should not be treated disrespectfully. Indeed, the Church has advocated for rights of same-sex couples in matters of hospitalization and medical care, fair housing and employment, and probate, so long as these do not infringe on the integrity of the traditional family or the constitutional rights of churches.

On August 23, 2021, in an address to faculty and staff at Brigham Young University, apostle Jeffrey R. Holland called for "a little more musket fire from this temple of learning" in "defending marriage as the union of a man and a woman."

Violence in the Mormon scriptures
War is a central, cyclical theme in the Book of Mormon. There are many wars mentioned in the Book of Mormon, depicted as the consequence of prideful or sinful behavior. Battles often occur between two peoples called the Nephites and Lamanites, but other groups attacked or drawn into battle include "secret combinations" (i.e., organized criminals), factions among the Jaredites.

The Book of Mormon concludes with a cataclysmic war between the Nephites and Lamanites. The final prophet of the Book of Mormon, a Nephite named Moroni, laments that his people have participated in sexual violence, torture, and cannibalism:

And notwithstanding this great abomination of the Lamanites, it doth not exceed that of our people in Moriantum. For behold, many of the daughters of the Lamanites have they taken prisoners; and after depriving them of that which was most dear and precious above all things, which is chastity and virtue—And after they had done this thing, they did murder them in a most cruel manner, torturing their bodies even unto death; and after they have done this, they devour their flesh like unto wild beasts, because of the hardness of their hearts; and they do it for a token of bravery.

Several decapitations and dismemberments are also described in the Book of Mormon. In chapter 4 of the First Book of Nephi, the prophet Nephi is commanded by the Spirit to kill a man named Laban, whom he decapitates. In Ether chapter 15, the warrior Coriantumr, who is the last survivor of the Jaredites, decapitates Shiz. In Alma chapter 17, Ammon (a Nephite missionary) defends a Lamanite king's livestock by cutting off the arms of several thieves and killing several others with a sling.

In chapter 9 of the Third Book of Nephi, Christ announces to ancient Americans that he has destroyed more than a dozen cities and their inhabitants due to their corruption. He announces that he destroyed some cities by causing them "to be burned with fire because of their sins and their wickedness", while others were "sunk in the depths of the sea" or "covered with earth". The text reports that some of the victims mourned, "O that we had repented before this great and terrible day, and had not killed and stoned the prophets, and cast them out; then would our mothers and our fair daughters, and our children have been spared".

The Book of Mormon is not unique in describing divinely directed or sanctioned violence. Additional examples appear in the Old Testament, which Mormons also consider to be sacred scripture.

See also

Act in Relation to Service
Act for the relief of Indian Slaves and Prisoners
Anti-Mormonism
Christianity and violence
Criticism of the Church of Jesus Christ of Latter-day Saints
Danite
Gladdenites (Attempted move to Utah)
Honor killing
Islam and violence
Judaism and violence
Latter Day Saint martyrs
Mormon Battalion
Pace memorandum
Utah in the American Civil War
Wars mentioned in the Book of Mormon

Notes

References

.
.
.
.
.
.
.
.
.
.
.
.
.
.
.
.
.
.
.
.
.
.
.
.
.
.
.
.
.
.
.
.
.
.
.
.
.
.
.
.
.
.
.
.
.
.
.
.

Further reading

 
History of the Latter Day Saint movement
Mormonism-related controversies
Mormon studies